The 2023 FIM Moto2 European Championship will be the second season after leaving the historical connection to CEV and the eighth under the FIM banner. This will be the first season without the Stock bikes.

Calendar 
The provisional calendar was published in November 2022.

Entry list

References

FIM CEV Moto2 European Championship
FIM Moto2
FIM Moto2